Blindarte is an Italian auction house specialising in art. It was founded in 1999 in Naples, Italy by Guglielmo Grilli, who is also its artistic director.

In 2004, Blindarte opened a storefront contemporary art gallery above its subterranean offices, soon to be expanded with a series of upper-level exhibition spaces.

In 2009, Blindhouse-Blindarte, a company working in the field of the professional custody of works of art and valuable objects, started to cooperate with the Montepaschi Group in order to manage services and investments connected to the art world.

References

External links
 Official Site of Blindarte
 "Street wise" on artforum
 "Blindarte-Blindhouse: un brindisi tra le tele" on ildenaro.it, in italian
 "Blindarte, una nuova galleria d’arte contemporanea a Napoli" on exibart.it, in italian
 "Blindarte Contemporanea. Spazio dell'arte e della teoria. Una conversazione con Guglielmo Grilli" on teknemedia.net, in italian
 "Dialogare con la città: La Galleria Blindarte di Napoli on genomart.com, in italian

Italian auction houses
Retail companies established in 1999
Italian companies established in 1999